James Coppinger (born 18 January 1981) is an English former professional footballer who played as an attacking midfielder. He began his career at Newcastle United, making one appearance in the Premier League, and later spent two years at Exeter City, but is best known for his association with Doncaster Rovers, whom he represented over seventeen seasons between 2004 and his retirement in 2021.

The only player ever to make over 600 appearances for Doncaster, he currently serves the club in a mentorship role. He is a former England under-16 international.

Career

Early career
Born in Guisborough, Cleveland, Coppinger started his career as a trainee for Darlington in 1997, though he was signed by fellow north-east side Newcastle United before he even made an appearance. Aged 17, he moved to Newcastle in a £500,000 joint deal with 19-year-old Paul Robinson in March 1998 when Kenny Dalglish was manager.

Coppinger later stated that as a teenager from a small town he was not fully prepared for life as a top-level professional player and he struggled to make any impact while coming through the Newcastle ranks, playing just once in the Premier League as a substitute against Tottenham Hotspur in August 2000.

After two loan spells at Hartlepool United and Queens Park Rangers, Coppinger's contract at Newcastle was ended by mutual consent and in July 2002 he moved to Exeter City in search of regular first team football.

Exeter City
He made his debut at Shrewsbury Town on 10 August 2002, netting his first goal two weeks later against Torquay United.

Coppinger has since stated that the move to the other end of England was a poor career choice at that stage of his development, and he admitted in 2015 that when Exeter were relegated from the Third Division at the end of the 2002–03 season, he was very close to quitting football. He said: "I had a lot of negative things going on in my life. I had a fear of failing – and also a fear of success. The way I was going and the way I was thinking, before I met Terry [Gormley, a motivational speaker], it was only a matter of time before I came out of football." He was persuaded to return to the club by manager Eamonn Dolan, and in his second season with Exeter he was involved in the England C (non-league select) squad, though records suggest he did not gain any official caps at that level.

Doncaster Rovers
Coppinger was bought by Doncaster manager Dave Penney for a reported £30,000 in May 2004 as he looked to strengthen the squad following promotion to League One. He was a constant feature in the side from the start, though in that first season, he failed to score in his 38 appearances. He scored an average of five goals in future seasons, his first goal eventually coming on 26 November 2005 in a 2–0 victory over Bristol City at Belle Vue.

He scored a hat-trick, described as "three goals of the highest quality" by the TV commentary, in the 2008 play-off semi-final against Southend United in a 5–1 victory which secured a place in the League One play-off final at Wembley against Leeds United. He was in Doncaster's starting eleven for the final, which Doncaster won, gaining promotion to the Championship.

On 14 September 2010, Coppinger scored a hat-trick against Norwich in a 3–1 victory.

On 21 July 2011, he signed a new contract at Doncaster which would keep him at the Keepmoat until 2014. Doncaster were relegated at the end of the 2011–12 season and needed to offload players to reduce the wage bill. As a result, he became a subject of interest from several Championship clubs including Barnsley, who he rejected a move to. After a few games, on 31 August, he was loaned to Nottingham Forest until January 2013 where he joined ex-Rovers players Simon Gillett and Billy Sharp under his former manager, Sean O'Driscoll. Dissatisfaction with the lack of games at Forest led him to return to Rovers after the loan spell.

Coming on as substitute in the 2–1 win over Stevenage on 12 January 2013, Coppinger reached the milestone of 300 league appearances for Doncaster, one of only ten players to do so at the club. On 27 April 2013, in an incredible final match of the season at Griffin Park, Coppinger scored the winning goal in a 1–0 away victory over Brentford in the final seconds of five minutes of added time just moments after Brentford's Marcello Trotta had hit a penalty against the crossbar. If Brentford had won, they would have been promoted and Doncaster would have had to compete in the play-offs. As it was, his goal put Doncaster one point above AFC Bournemouth and they were crowned champions.

Coppinger became only the fifth Rovers player to reach 350 league appearances when he turned out to play right wing-back against Nottingham Forest in a 0–0 draw at the City Ground on 15 March 2014. Doncaster were relegated back to League One on the final day of the 2013–14 season following a 1–0 defeat at Leicester City.

On 9 September 2016, Coppinger won the Football League Two Player of the Month for the month of August. The following day, he celebrated the remarkable milestone of reaching 500 Doncaster appearances by scoring in a 5–1 away victory over Morecambe. On 31 January 2017, Coppinger extended his contract until the end of the 2017–18 season.

In May 2019, he signed a new one-year contract with the club. In July 2020, Coppinger signed another one-year deal. He also confirmed that after 16 years at the club, this would be his final season as a professional footballer.

In commemoration of his seventeen-year career with Doncaster, Coppinger was commissioned to design the club's third kit in support of the CALM charity. The team wore this for the first time in a home match against Hull City on 20 February 2021. Coppinger came on as a second-half substitute and scored a direct free kick to equalise in stoppage time. On 6 March 2021, Coppinger became the first player to reach 600 league appearances for Doncaster Rovers, setting up both goals in a 2–1 win against Plymouth Argyle at the Keepmoat Stadium. He is the 21st player in Football League history to reach this milestone. On 29 April 2021, in the EFL End of Season awards, Coppinger was awarded the Sir Tom Finney award, presented to a player who has contributed an enormous amount to the EFL during their career. On 9 May 2021, Coppinger announced his retirement after club record of 695 games.

Personal life
Doncaster Rovers have worked with the NSPCC since the beginning of 2009. In June 2011, Coppinger, along with Mark Wilson, James O'Connor, other Rovers staff and local Doncaster businessmen David Plant and Brian Butcher walked the 62-mile Inca Trek raising almost £50,000 for the charity. He has also set up 'Pro Mindset', a mentoring and support service for footballers, and 'Kixx Middlesbrough', a local youth coaching academy.

In January 2013, along with several other people, including fellow footballers, Coppinger faced a race-fixing inquiry with allegations of corruption in gambling on horses to lose on Betting exchanges in nine races between 1 November 2010 and 31 March 2011. He strongly denied the charges, though was found guilty of corrupt and fraudulent practices by the British Horseracing Authority and given a three-year ban from any dealings with registered racing individuals.

He will receive the Freedom of the Borough of Doncaster on 21 May 2022.

Career statistics

Honours
Doncaster Rovers
Football League One: 2012–13; play-offs: 2008
Football League Trophy: 2006–07

Individual
Sir Tom Finney award: 2021
PFA Team of the Year: 2016–17 League Two
Doncaster Rovers Player of the Year: 2017–18
Football League Two Player of the Month: August 2016

References

External links

James Coppinger profile at the official Doncaster Rovers F.C. website
YouTube James Coppinger – Best Hat-trick Ever!

1981 births
Living people
People from Guisborough
Footballers from North Yorkshire
English footballers
England youth international footballers
Association football midfielders
Darlington F.C. players
Newcastle United F.C. players
Hartlepool United F.C. players
Queens Park Rangers F.C. players
Exeter City F.C. players
Doncaster Rovers F.C. players
Nottingham Forest F.C. players
Premier League players
English Football League players
National League (English football) players
Doncaster Rovers F.C. non-playing staff